Fleet Shadower can refer to either of two aircraft designed to tail enemy vessels.

Airspeed Fleet Shadower
General Aircraft Fleet Shadower